The Afizere people (Other:  Afizarek, exonym: Jarawa) are an ethnic group that occupy Jos East, Jos North, parts of Jos South and Mangu Local Government Areas of Plateau State and parts of Toro and Tafawa Balewa Local Government Areas of Bauchi State, Nigeria. The Afizere are speakers of Izere language. The neighbors of the Afizere to the north are the Hausa and Jarawan Dass. To the East and South East are the Zari, Sayawa and Pyem. To the South and South- West are the Berom while the Irigwe  and Rukuba lie to the West. On to the North-west of the Afizere are found a number of ethnic groups the closest of which are the Anaguta, Bujel, Ribina, Kayauri and Duguza while the more distant ones include Buji, Gusu, Sanga, Jere, Amoa and Lemoro.

Settlement
The Afizere previously settled in the Chawai region of southern Kaduna State and as time passed different Afizere groups moved southwards. The first group from Southern Kaduna settled at the foot of the hills called Gwash close to the current location of the Jos Museum and others settled at the foot of Shere Hills in the Jos Plateau.  Different Afizere clans soon settled southwards of Chawai lands. Currently there are more than 500,000 Afizere people distributed over 16 major traditional districts who inhabit territories within Jos North, Jos East, Mangu, in Plateau State and Tafawa-Balewa and Toro Local Government Areas in Bauchi State. During the pre-colonial period, the people lived in hilly terrains surrounding the Jos Plateau as a defense mechanism against jihadist attacks during and after the Fulani Jihad. Some Afizere towns and villages include Dong, Tudun Wada (Gyese), Kabong, Jos Jarawa, Rikkos, Fudawa, Kwanga, Fobur, Angware, Maijuju, Fusa, and Gwafan (Lamingo), Shere, Zandi, etc.

Culture
Izere towns have a traditional and gerontocratic chieftaincy system that is headed by an Agwom and supported by five districts heads representing the five royal families of the Afizere: Fobur, Forsum, Maigemu, Shere and Federe. In Afizere land, a district could be a combination of 6 to 12 villages. Historically, the Agwom was also the chief priest of the people

A traditional dance called Asharuwa is one of the cultural heritage the Afizere have maintained over the years. The asharwa dance group represented Nigeria in countries like United States, UK, Canada, Germany, South Africa, Ukraine, and Kenya.

Language

The language of the people is called Izere and it is spoken in five different dialects. The dialects are Ibor spoken largely in the Fobur district, Isum spoken in Forsum villages, Iganang spoken in Shere, Ifudere spoken in Federe and Ikyo. Izere is considered to be part of the Benue-Congo language group that is prominent in Central Nigeria.

Dresses
Kings wear kukpra and have their hair barbed, with the hair like a row in the middle of their heads and step by step horizontal cuts all throughout, signifying the crown. They have a ceremonial staff called an akbong with one strand. Priests wear the same clothes as the king, but what differentiates them is the king's haircut and his staff, as the priest's akbong has two strands.

Men wear itak round their waists. Women wear akpi made from atufa or agindo, covering their chest and going around their waists.

Kurus are used to keep babies tight on the back of their mothers and it is water resistant.

For brides and grooms, the same clothing they would normally wear is used, but it is freshly made.

Izere colors and their order 
 GREEN [NAYA]: signifies Agriculture
 WHITE [CHA’AN]: signifies Peace
 YELLOW [IZIZERE]: signifies the Language
 BLACK [AGA’AB]: signifies Strength
 COWRIES [ICRIBI]: signifies Riches

Religion
Christianity and Islam are the two major religions among the Afizere, but some Afizere still choose to adhere to their traditional beliefs. In traditional Afizere religion, there is a supreme deity called Adakunom, meaning father of the sun, who is considered the creator and source of life and health. A few minor gods exist to act as mediators to Adakunom. Father of the sun is the literal translation of Adakunom, but it can be translated as "father, the sun" or "mighty sun" (the almighty sun). Then there are the spirits or witches who are the source of both good and evil.

Christianity came to Afizere land by the way of Sudan Interior Mission preachers who converted some Afizere individuals who later acted as agents of dispersion of the religion. Islam came to the region after the Fulani jihad when part of Afizere territory came under the authority of the Emir of Bauchi

Names 
The Izere people like many other tribes or ethnic groups have unique names given to children at birth. A child could be named in accordance to a situation or circumstance leading to his/her birth. Some traditional Izere names and meaning are:

 .Abok = Physician
 Adar = Star
 Afan = Rest
 Agwom = Ruler of people
 Ajang/Azhang = Defender
 Itse = A strong man
 Atsen = A visitor
 Arum = A prosperous man
 Atu = A blacksmith
 Atsi = A priest
 Abi= Long awaited female child
 Igbarak= A tower
 Azong = I ask
 Ayisa = Born during isaah festival
 Ayong = What have been expected
 Akare = clean
 Akuben = Good seed
 Akutse = Blessing of God
 Ikok = A protector or unite together
 Ayom = Born during Mourning period
 Isha = A player or dancer
 Adang = Patience
 Azhik = Handsome
 Kaze = The only one
 Arin = Not to miss again
 Igyem = A person with wisdom
 Azok = A unique
 Agok/Itsegok = Double fruitful
 Inyam = Good for fortune
 Akassa = Sharing equally.
 Atang = The best shooter
 Izang = Victorious
 Afe = To say something
 Azhi or Aizhi = 1st born or my heart desire
 Azi = Un-ended/uncountable
 Ido = Miracle or surprise
 Adubok = An expert on future issue
 Ashom = Prophesy
 Anap = Born after male child or festival renap
 Atong = Born after many male children
 Anya = Born with identification mark
 Abi = Long awaited female child
 Akutsang = Good company out with strength
 Atako = To have strong faith as rock
 Adizha = Good seed choose
 Asang = I was barren or I have no body
 Ado/Adado = Gradually reducing naturally
 Amaji = First born of the family
With the coming of Christianity, some persons within the Izere circle suggested names that with biblical inclination. Some of this names and their meaning include:

 KUMRITEK - Always Good
 KUNOMNISHIM - (in short NISHIM) God loves me.
 ATOMKUNOM - Messenger of God
 KUNOMSINAZA - God is in heaven.
 KUNOMBEMI - God with me.
 KUNOMSIBEMI - God is with me.
 KUKYEM - Ability, Authority or Power. Ability Authority; Power
 KUKYEMKUNOM - Power of God; the authority of God.
 KUNOMREN - God knows.
 KUNOMSAASI - The Lord is coming back.
 KURENKUNOM - The knowledge of God.
 ATSETSẸK - comforter.
 ATSIKUNOM - Priest of God.
 AWANKUNOM - Only God; One God.
 AZHAUKUNOM - Invisible God.
 ATURUKKUNOM - the lamb of God.
 KANYẸK - Mystery
 CAANG - (pronounce as Chaang) Peace; Peaceful.
 KUCẸKUNOM - God's blessing.
 IGONZHING (IGON-AZHING) - Child of Wonder; Wonderful Child.
 ISHORONG - Reward
 ISONGKUNOM - God's breath
 KUYAKASHỌỌN/ IYAKASHỌỌN- Progress; Success.

Dance
It is not just Asharwa dance that we have in Izere, below is a list of dances we also performed.

1. The Asharwa dance - predominantly performed by young Afizere boys and men in all occasions.

2. Amata dance - predominantly performed by  Afizere women both young and old in all occasions

3. Agba dance - predominantly performed by men both young and old during royal outing, coronations or royal ceremonies.

4. Agafu dance - is predominantly performed by Afizere men in all occasions

5. Asurbe dance - this is performed by all categories of Afizere during funeral rite of an elderly person only.

6. Natoo abarshi/ikap/ isun dance - this is performed mostly during farming/ harvest by predominantly Afizere men

7. Apanga dance - is a dance performed by only the royalties, during ceremonies/ coronation.

8. Natoo rekuron - this kind of dance is predominantly performed by Afizere young and elderly women only during farming activities.

9. Beating of drums and singing on the farm, with the asum - mata leading

Food 
The Afizere people have different foods and mode of preparation that distinguishes them from other ethnic groups. A few are:
 Ikam Itson (hungry rice), made from muster and water.
 Akare (Gwate, Pate), made from grinded maize, vegetables, garden eggs, sorel (yakuwa) and water.
Iririr, made from grinded abusu, meat, little water, salt, pepper and nami rifar (Olive oil).
 Nakan, made from hungry rice (muster seed) honey and water.
 Akpam, made from hungry rice (muster), red oil and water.
 Asirik itcha, made from millet and Tamber.
 Asirik Itson, made from Grinded muster (hungry rice) and water.
 Asirik Ariron, made from ariron and guinea corn.
 Rining Kapkok (soup), made from Izōs, rituh, natok, kapkok, salt and water.
 Ishutuk (round about beans), made from Ishutuk, abusu, salt, and pepper namai rifar.

References

Further reading
Appiah, Kwame Anthony and Henry Louis Gates, Jr. Africana, 1st edition. New York: Basic Civitas Books, .
https://www.bible.com/bible/2070/MAT.1.IZRNT

Ethnic groups in Nigeria